Mount Kaukau is a large hill in the northern suburbs of Wellington, New Zealand near Johnsonville, Khandallah and Ngaio.  The summit is 445 metres above sea level and is the most visible high point in the Wellington landscape further accentuated by Wellington's main television transmitter mast, which stands 122m from the summit. The city, harbour and the Remutaka and Tararua Ranges can be seen from the summit. On a clear day Mt. Tapuae-o-Uenuku and the Kaikoura Ranges in the South Island may be seen, whilst northwest is the Porirua Basin and the Tasman Sea.

Name
The hill's original name Tarikākā means 'where the parrots rested' and is shared with the nearby settlement in Ngaio at the base of the mountain. Before the clearing of the native totara forest on the slopes and general area, the native parrot kākā was common through the city. Over a hundred years later today, the population of kākā has begun to regenerate thanks mostly to the efforts at Zealandia, and are becoming a more regular sight throughout the city and in the rejuvenating native forest on the slopes of Mount Kaukau.

Slopes and surrounding area
Much of the eastern 'city side' slopes of Mount Kaukau make up Khandallah Park, which is one of the oldest parks in New Zealand, established in 1888 and then registered as a domain in 1909. Khandallah Park has more than 60 hectares of native forest. Native birds such as the kererū, tūī and New Zealand fantail are common sights when walking through the native forest. Stumps of the old totara trees can also be seen walking through the first lower parts of the forest. In mid 2017 an old bunker off Woodmancote Road, at the base of Mount Kaukau, was rediscovered after it had been sealed off and forgotten many years previously. The bunker in an 'H' shape, had been built for Royal New Zealand Signals Corps in 1942. Due to poor construction the bunker was very leaky and was never used. Mount Kaukau forms part of the Northern Skyline track from Johnsonville to Karori and Makara.

Recreation
Khandallah Park has 9 kilometres of walking tracks allowing access to the peak of Mt Kaukau from Khandallah, Johnsonville, Ngaio and Crofton Downs. Some tracks are also open to mountain biking and e-biking.

Transmitter

The 122-metre Mount Kaukau television transmitter was built in 1965 to transmit television channel WNTV1 offering improved coverage over the channel's previous transmitter at Mount Victoria. Today it is the main television and FM radio transmitter for the Wellington metropolitan area.

In May 2022, Kordia removed the top 18 metres of the aerial, as the section was redundant following the end of analogue television broadcast.

Transmission Frequencies
The following table contains television and radio frequencies currently operating at Mount Kaukau:

Former analogue television frequencies
The following frequencies were used until 29 September 2013, when Kaukau switched off analogue broadcasts (see Digital changeover dates in New Zealand).

Kaukau Challenge

Every year Khandallah School, which is at the base of Mount Kaukau, organises a fun walk / fun run from the school to the summit and back, called the Kaukau Challenge.  The Kaukau Challenge has been an annual event since 2006 with about 500 people taking part each year.

Snowfall of 2011

In mid-August 2011, two Wellington men, Nick Fone and Daniel McFadyen claimed to be the first people to ski and snowboard down Mount Kaukau when they took advantage of the unusual weather pattern delivering snow to most parts of the North Island. As Wellington has a temperate climate, snow down to near sea level is extremely rare, happening less often than once every 15 years.

References

Wellington City
Tourist attractions in Wellington City
Kauk
Towers in New Zealand